WATZ may refer to:

 WATZ-FM, a radio station (99.3 FM) licensed to serve Alpena, Michigan, United States
 WATZ (AM), a defunct radio station (1450 AM) formerly licensed to serve Alpena, Michigan